Litostroma is a genus of marine alga that may be a red, although green and brown affinities have also been proposed.  It consists of single-cell-thick thalli that reached about 6 mm in diameter and 140 µm thickness.

References

Algae genera
Enigmatic algae taxa
Fossil algae